Australian bilateral treaties on postal services and money orders are Australian treaties concerning postal services and money orders.

They date from 1881 to 1961, and ended with the Universal Postal Union and demise of the money order.

List
 1881 – Convention between Victoria and the United States of America for the Exchange of Money Orders (Melbourne-Washington, 5 October-9 December 1881)
 1890 – Convention between the United Kingdom of Great Britain and Ireland and France respecting Postal Communications [mail packets] (London, 30 August 1890)
 1897 – Convention between the United Kingdom of Great Britain and Ireland and France for the Exchange of [uninsured] Postal Parcels between Australia and France (Paris, 1 December 1897)
 1898 – Additional Convention between the United Kingdom of Great Britain and Ireland and France [amending Article X] to the Convention for the Exchange of [uninsured] Postal Parcels between Australia and France of 1 December 1897 (Paris, 24 December 1898)
 1903 – Convention for the Exchange of Money Orders between the Commonwealth of Australia and the Colony of Hong Kong
 1903 – Convention between the Commonwealth of Australia and the Colony of New Zealand concerning the Exchange of Money Orders
 1905 – Convention for the Exchange of Money Orders between the Commonwealth of Australia and the Colony of Ceylon
 1905 – Parcels Post Convention between the Commonwealth of Australia and the United States of America
 1906 – Convention between the Commonwealth of Australia and the Dominion of Canada for the Exchange of Money Orders
 1906 – Convention between the Commonwealth of Australia and the Colony of Fiji concerning the Exchange of Money Orders
 1906 – Agreement concerning an Exchange of Postal Parcels between the Commonwealth of Australia and the Empire of Japan
 1906 – Convention between the Commonwealth of Australia and the Kingdom of Tonga concerning the Exchange of Money Orders
 1909 – Agreement for an Exchange of Uninsured Postal Parcels between the Commonwealth of Australia and Ceylon [Sri Lanka]
 1909 – Amendment to [Article 4 of] the Parcel Post Convention between Australia and the United States of America of 10 May 1905
 1910 – Convention respecting the Exchange of Money Orders between the Commonwealth of Australia and Norway, and Detailed Regulations
 1911 – Agreement for an Exchange of Postal Parcels between the Commonwealth of Australia and Ocean Island and Gilbert and Ellice Islands [Kiribati/Tuvalu]
 1911 – Parcel Post Agreement between the Commonwealth of Australia and the Union of South Africa
 1912 – Agreement between the General Post Office of the Commonwealth of Australia and the General Post Office of the Dutch East Indies for the Exchange of Money Orders
 1912 – Agreement for an Exchange of Postal Parcels between the Commonwealth of Australia and the Dominion of New Zealand
 1912 – Convention for the Exchange of Money Orders between the Postal Administration of the Commonwealth of Australia and the Postal Administration of the Union of South Africa
 1912 – Further Amendment to [Article 4 of] the Parcels Post Convention between the Commonwealth of Australia and the United States of America of 10 May 1905
 1913 – Convention between the Commonwealth of Australia and the United States of America for the Exchange of Money Orders
 1914 – Agreement for an Exchange of Postal Parcels between the Commonwealth of Australia and the Dominion of Canada
 1914 – Australian Treaty Series 1914 No 4 – Agreement between the Commonwealth of Australia and the British Solomon Islands Protectorate and the Gilbert and Ellice Islands Protectorate for the Exchange of Money Orders
 1915 – Agreement for an Exchange of Postal Parcels between the Commonwealth of Australia and the Philippine Islands
 1915 – Agreement between the Commonwealth of Australia and British New Guinea for the Exchange of Money Orders
 1917 – Agreement between the Commonwealth of Australia and British North Borneo for the Exchange of Money Orders
 1917 – Agreement between the Commonwealth of Australia and the Territory of Papua for the Exchange of Postal Notes
 1920 – Agreement for an Exchange of Postal Parcels between the Commonwealth of Australia and [British] North Borneo
 1921 – Convention Between the Commonwealth of Australia and the Federated Malay States, For the Exchange of Money Orders
 1921 – Agreement Between the Commonwealth of Australia and Nauru for the Exchange of Money Orders
 1923 – Agreement between the Commonwealth of Australia and the Dutch East Indies for the Exchange of Money Orders
 1923 – Agreement between the Government of the Commonwealth of Australia and the Government of the Netherlands East Indies for the Exchange of Postal Parcels
 1924 – Convention for the Exchange of Money Orders between the Postal Administration of the Commonwealth of Australia and the Postal Administration of Malta
 1925 – Additional Articles between the Post Office of the Commonwealth of Australia and the Department of Communications of the Empire of Japan amending the Detailed Regulations of 9 October-14 December 1906 for the Execution
 1925 – Agreement between the Government of Australia and the Government of New Zealand for the Exchange of Insured Postal Parcels
 1926 – Agreement for an Exchange of Insured Postal Parcels between Australia and Fiji
 1926 – Agreement for an Exchange of Uninsured Postal Parcels between Australia and Fiji
 1926 – Convention for the Exchange of Money Orders between the Postal Administrations of Australia and Germany
 1927 – Annex to the Agreement for an Exchange of Postal Parcels between Australia and Canada of 1 August-21 November 1913
 1927 – Convention between the Postal Administration of the Commonwealth of Australia and the Postal Administration of Norway for the Direct Exchange of Uninsured Postal Parcels between the Commonwealth of Australia and Norway
 1927 – Agreement concerning the Exchange of Postal Parcels between Australia and Switzerland
 1929 – Convention for the Exchange of Money Orders between Australia and New Caledonia and Dependencies
 1929 – Agreement for an Exchange of Uninsured Postal Parcels between Australia and British Solomon Islands
 1932 – Agreement for an Exchange of Postal Parcels between the Commonwealth of Australia and Germany
 1932 – Agreement for an Exchange of Postal Parcels between the Commonwealth of Australia and Italy
 1932 – Agreement between the Commonwealth of Australia and the Territory of New Guinea for the Exchange of Postal Notes
 1933 – Agreement for an Exchange of Postal Parcels between the Commonwealth of Australia and Hong Kong
 1933 – Agreement for an Exchange of Postal Parcels between the Commonwealth of Australia and Netherlands Indies
 1934 – Agreement for an Exchange of Postal Parcels between Australia and Egypt
 1934 – Agreement for an Exchange of Postal Parcels between Australia and France
 1934 – Agreement between the Post Office of the Commonwealth of Australia and the Post Office of Italy for the Exchange of Money Orders
 1934 – Agreement for the Exchange of Postal Parcels between the Commonwealth of Australia and the Territory of Papua
 1935 – Agreement between the Post Office of the Commonwealth of Australia and the Post Office of the Irish Free State for the Exchange of Money Orders
 1935 – Agreement between the Postal Department of the Commonwealth of Australia and the Postal Department of Malaya for the Exchange of Money Orders
 1937 – Agreement for an Exchange of Postal Parcels between the Commonwealth of Australia and Malaya
 1938 – Exchange of Despatches constituting an Agreement between the Government of the Commonwealth of Australia and the Government of the United Kingdom of Great Britain and Northern Ireland relating to Air Transport of Mail
 1940 – Arrangement for the Exchange of Parcels by Parcel Post between the Post Office of the Commonwealth of Australia and the Indian Post Office, and Detailed Regulations
 1940 – Agreement for an Exchange of [insured and uninsured] Postal Parcels between the Commonwealth of Australia and Ceylon
 1941 – Agreement for the Exchange of Telegraph Money Orders between the Commonwealth of Australia and Malaya
 1941 – Agreement for the Exchange of Money Orders between the Commonwealth of Australia and India
 1941 – Agreement for an Exchange of Postal Parcels between the Commonwealth of Australia and Aden, and Detailed Regulations
 1949 – Parcel Post Agreement between the Commonwealth of Australia and the Republic of the Philippines
 1949 – Agreement for the Exchange of Money Orders between the Commonwealth of Australia and Pakistan
 1952 – Agreement between Australia and the United States of America concerning the Exchange of Parcel Post, and Regulations of Execution
 1952 – Agreement for the Exchange of Postal Parcels between the Commonwealth of Australia and Pakistan, and Detailed Regulations
 1953 – Agreement for an Exchange of Postal Parcels between the Commonwealth of Australia and the Kingdom of the Netherlands
 1953 – Exchange of Notes between the Government of the United Kingdom of Great Britain and Ireland and the Government of Japan regarding the Agreement respecting the Tonnage Measurement of Merchant Ships of 30 November 1922
 1954 – Agreement for the Exchange of [postal] Parcels between the Commonwealth of Australia and Greece
 1954 – Agreement for the Exchange of Postal Parcels between the Commonwealth of Australia and the State of Israel
 1954 – Agreement for an Exchange of Postal Parcels between the Commonwealth of Australia and the People's Republic of Poland
 1954 – Agreement for an Exchange of Postal Parcels between the Commonwealth of Australia and Austria
 1955 – Agreement for the Exchange of Postal Parcels between the Commonwealth of Australia and the Hungarian People's Republic
 1955 – Agreement for the Exchange of Postal Parcels between the Commonwealth of Australia and the Republic of China [Taiwan]
 1955 – Agreement for the Exchange of Postal Parcels between the Commonwealth of Australia and the Republic of Czechoslovakia
 1956 – Agreement for an Exchange of Postal Parcels between the Commonwealth of Australia and the Federal People's Republic of Yugoslavia
 1957 – Agreement between the Commonwealth of Australia and the Condominium of the New Hebrides for the Exchange of Money Orders
 1958 – Agreement between the Government of the Commonwealth of Australia and the Government of the United States of America concerning the Exchange of Postal Parcels between the United States of America and the Territory of Papua and the Trust Territory of New Guinea, and Detailed Regulations
 1959 – Agreement for an Exchange of Money Orders between the Commonwealth of Australia and the Kingdom of the Netherlands
 1960 – Agreement for an Exchange of Postal Parcels between the Commonwealth of Australia and the Union of Soviet Socialist Republics
 1960 – Exchange of Notes constituting an Agreement between the Government of Australia and the Government of the Kingdom of the Netherlands amending the Agreement for the Exchange of Postal Parcels of 22 October 1953
 1961 – Agreement for the Exchange of International Money Orders between the Commonwealth of Australia and Japan
 1961 – Exchange of Notes constituting an Agreement between the Government of Australia and the Government of the Kingdom of the Netherlands to amend the Agreement of 4 August 1959 amending the Agreement for the Exchange of Postal Parcels of 22 October 1953
 1962 – Parcel Post Agreement between the Government of the Commonwealth of Australia and the Government of Japan
 1962 – Agreement between the Government of the Commonwealth of Australia and the Governments of the Federation of Malaya and of the State of Singapore concerning the Exchange of Parcels by Parcel Post between Malaya and Christmas Island
 1962 – Second Protocol between the Government of the Commonwealth of Australia and the Government of New Caledonia and Dependencies to the Agreement for the Exchange of Ordinary Postal Parcels of 17 August 1928, as amended
 1963 – Agreement between the Commonwealth of Australia and the Federal Republic of Germany concerning the Exchange of Postal Parcels
 1964 – Third Protocol between the Government of the Commonwealth of Australia and the Government of New Caledonia and Dependencies to the Agreement for the Exchange of Ordinary Postal Parcels of 17 August 1928, as amended
 1965 – Agreement for an Exchange of Money Orders between the Commonwealth of Australia and Southern Rhodesia
 1965 – Agreement between the Government of the Commonwealth of Australia and the Government of the Federal Republic of Germany regarding the Exchange of Money Orders
 1969 – Agreement between the Government of the Commonwealth of Australia and the Government of Canada concerning Uninsured and Insured Parcels
 1971 – Agreement between the Government of the Commonwealth of Australia and the Government of the Republic of South Africa concerning Postal Parcels
 1973 – Agreement concerning the Exchange of Money Orders between Australia and Yugoslavia
 1979 – Agreement on Postal Relations between the Government of Australia and the Government of the Socialist Republic of Viet Nam
 1981 – Agreement between the Government of Australia and the Government of Malta for the Exchange of Money Orders
 1981 – Agreement between the Government of Australia and the Government of the People's Republic of Bangladesh for the Exchange of Money Orders
 1982 – Agreement for the Exchange of International Money Orders between the Government of Australia and the Government of the Republic of the Philippines
 1985 – Agreement between the Government of Australia and the Government of Norway for the Exchange of Money Orders
 1963 – Agreement between the Government of the Commonwealth of Australia and the Government of the United Kingdom of Great Britain and Northern Ireland concerning the Exchange of Money Orders between the Trust Territory of Nauru and the Gilbert and Ellice Islands Colony

References

Australian bilateral treaties on postal services and money orders